Avik or Åvik may refer to the following people
Given name
Avik Kabessa, Israeli-American businessman
Avik Roy, Bengali-American journalist, editor, political strategist and investment analyst

Surname
Bruno Åvik (born 1940), Finnish-born Swedish cross-country skier

People 

 Avik Anwar, Bangladeshi motor racer

See also
Åvik, a village in Norway
Aavik